Processor may refer to:

Computing

Hardware  
 Processor (computing)
Central processing unit (CPU), the hardware within a computer that executes a program
 Microprocessor, a central processing unit contained on a single integrated circuit (IC)
 Application-specific instruction set processor (ASIP), a component used in system-on-a-chip design
 Graphics processing unit (GPU), a processor designed for doing dedicated graphics-rendering computations
 Physics processing unit (PPU), a dedicated microprocessor designed to handle the calculations of physics
 Digital signal processor (DSP), a specialized microprocessor designed specifically for digital signal processing
Image processor, a specialized DSP used for image processing in digital cameras, mobile phones or other devices
 Coprocessor
 Floating-point unit
 Network processor, a microprocessor specifically targeted at the networking application domain
 Multi-core processor, single component with two or more independent CPUs (called "cores") on the same chip carrier or on the same die
 Front-end processor, a helper processor for communication between a host computer and other devices

Software 
 Word processor, a computer application used for the production of potentially printable material
 Document processor, a computer application that superficially resembles a word processor—but emphasizes the visual layout of the document's components

Systems 
 Data processing system, a combination of machines, people, and processes that for a set of inputs produces a defined set of outputs
 Information system, a system composed of people and computers that processes or interprets information

Other
 Firewood processor, a machine designed to cut and split firewood
 Food processor, an appliance used to facilitate repetitive tasks in the preparation of food

See also
 
 Process (disambiguation)
 Data processing (disambiguation)